Nieves Mathews (1917–2003) was a British translator and writer best known for her biography of Sir Francis Bacon.

Family
Born Nieves Hayat de Madariaga Archibald in Glasgow, Scotland, on 3 December 1917, she was the elder daughter of the Spanish diplomat and writer Salvador de Madariaga and the Scottish economic historian Constance Helen Margaret (née Archibald). Her younger sister was the historian Isabel de Madariaga.

She studied French and Spanish at King's College London. On 23 April 1939 she married Paul William Mathews and had two children.

Career and writings
Mathews began her career at the British Council in Mexico City and later worked as a translator and report writer for various international organisations in Angola, Uruguay and Europe, including over 20 years spent with the Food and Agriculture Organization (a United Nations agency headquartered in Rome).

In 1956 she published a crime novel, entitled She Died Without Light.

Her biography of Sir Francis Bacon, entitled Francis Bacon: The History of a Character Assassination, was published by Yale University in 1996. She claimed in the acknowledgements that the book was suggested and blessed by "my teacher, Osho" (Rajneesh), "who thought highly of Sir Francis Bacon and gave the book his blessing". She was also deeply influenced by the works of Immanuel Velikovsky.

Mathews also contributed poems, articles and stories to periodicals, including Encounter, Cambridge Literary Review and Baconiana.

References

External links
Nieves on Francis Bacon
Nieves letter about Velikovsky
Letters to and from Eric Sams (in the Sams/Shakespeare Archive of the Centro Studi Eric Sams)

1917 births
2003 deaths
Scottish women novelists
Spanish women novelists
Spanish people of Scottish descent
Women biographers
20th-century British women writers
20th-century biographers
20th-century Scottish novelists
20th-century Scottish women